Manitouwadge is a township in the Canadian province of Ontario. Marie.

History

Manitouwadge (Manidoowaazh in Ojibwe, meaning "Cave of the Great Spirit") is part of the wide-ranging territory of the Ojibwe people.  The town itself was founded by General Engineering Co Limited (later as Noranda and now part of Xstrata) after staking claims in 1953 to support of copper mine. The other mine in Manitouwadge is the Willroy mine, named after two of the "Weekend Prospectors"  William Dawidowich and Roy Barker. Full production at Geco and Willroy began in 1957.

From 1954 to 1974 Manitouwadge was classified as an Improvement District.  The community became an incorporated township in 1975.

Noranda acquired the mining rights to a significant portion of the ground in that area, and built the Golden Giant Mine. It offered housing in Manitouwadge to many of the employees of the new mine, and the town boomed.

When the Geco mine closed in 1995, Manitouwadge's population decreased significantly. After peaking at nearly 4000 people in the early 1990s, it decreased to less than 3000 by 2001. With the closing of the Golden Giant Mine in 2006, the population dropped to 2,100 by 2011.

Today

While mining has always been at the forefront of Manitouwadge's economic activity, forestry also plays a significant part in the town's economy. The town is currently seeking new industry and residents and offers some of the lowest housing and commercial property prices in Ontario. A longstanding joke in Manitouwadge is that a resident would pay more for their vehicle than for their home.

Demographics 

Recreation

Hiking and skiing

Trails for hiking in the summer and trails for snowmobilers in the winter are also abundant. Thirteen runs for downhill skiing are present at the Kiwissa Ski Club, as well as two locations with cross country ski trails managed by the Northern Trails Ski Club. From the top of the Kiwissa ski hill, one can see almost the whole town.

Trivia
Manitouwadge's municipal limits include four geographic townships: Mapledoram, Leslie, Gemmel, and Gertrude.
Manitouwadge was the first Model Town established in Ontario.
Nearby Mose Lake is named after Moses Fisher, the native guide of James E. Thomson on his 1931 exploration of the Manitouwadge area.  Name duplication required the S be dropped.
From 1954 to 1974 Manitouwadge was classified as an Improvement District.  The community attained Township classification in 1975.
Birthplace of Stanley Cup and Olympic gold medal winning hockey coach Mike Babcock.

Climate
Manitouwadge has a humid continental climate (Dfb) bordering on a subarctic climate (Dfc), typical in Northern Ontario. Summers are generally warm and rainy with cool nights. Winters are typically very cold and very snowy. Winter usually begins late October and lasts into April.

See also
List of townships in Ontario
List of francophone communities in Ontario

References

External links 

Company towns in Canada
Mining communities in Ontario
Municipalities in Thunder Bay District
Single-tier municipalities in Ontario
Township municipalities in Ontario